The Deutsche Mark (English: German mark), abbreviated "DM" or "D-Mark", was the official currency of West Germany from 1948 until 1990 and later the unified Germany from 1990 until the adoption of the euro in 2002. In English, it was typically called the "Deutschmark". One Deutsche Mark was divided into 100 pfennigs.

It was first issued under Allied occupation in 1948 to replace the Reichsmark and served as the Federal Republic of Germany's official currency from its founding the following year. On 31 December 1998, the Council of the European Union fixed the irrevocable exchange rate, effective 1 January 1999, for German mark to euros as DM 1.95583 = €1. In 1999, the Deutsche Mark was replaced by the euro; its coins and banknotes remained in circulation, defined in terms of euros, until the introduction of euro notes and coins on 1 January 2002. The Deutsche Mark ceased to be legal tender immediately upon the introduction of the euro—in contrast to the other eurozone states, where the euro and legacy currency circulated side by side for up to two months. Mark coins and banknotes continued to be accepted as valid forms of payment in Germany until 28 February 2002.

The Deutsche Bundesbank has guaranteed that all German marks in cash form may be changed into euros indefinitely, and one may do so in person at any branch of the Bundesbank in Germany. Banknotes and coins can even be sent to the Bundesbank by mail. In 2012, it was estimated that as many as 13.2 billion marks were in circulation, with one poll from 2011 showing a narrow majority of Germans favouring the currency's restoration (although only a minority believed this would bring any economic benefit). Newer polls indicate that only a minority of Germans is supportive of a reintroduction of the Deutsche Mark.

History

Before 1871

A mark had been the currency of Germany since its original unification in 1871. Before that time, the different German states issued a variety of different currencies, the most common being the North German thaler and the South German gulden. By 1857 though both currencies have been linked to the Vereinsthaler, a silver coin containing  grams of pure silver. Although the German gold mark was based on gold rather than silver (at 2.79 marks per gram of fine gold), a fixed exchange rate between the Vereinsthaler and the mark of 3 marks = 1 Vereinsthaler was used for the conversion.

1873–1948
The first mark, known as the Goldmark, was introduced in 1873. With the outbreak of World War I, the mark was taken off the gold standard. The currency thus became known as the Papiermark, especially as high inflation, then hyperinflation occurred and the currency became exclusively made up of paper money. The Papiermark was replaced by the Rentenmark (RM) from November 15, 1923, and the Reichsmark (ℛℳ) in 1924.

Early military occupation following WWII
During the first two years of occupation the occupying powers of France, United Kingdom, United States, and the Soviet Union were not able to successfully negotiate a possible currency reform in Germany. Due to the strains between the Allies each zone was governed independently as regards monetary matters. The US occupation policy was governed by the directive JCS 1067 (in effect until July 1947), which forbade the US military governor "to take any steps to strengthen German financial structure". As a consequence a separate monetary reform in the U.S. zone was not possible. Each of the Allies printed its own occupation currency.

Currency reform of June 1948
The Deutsche Mark was officially introduced on Sunday, June 20, 1948, by Ludwig Erhard. The old Reichsmark and Rentenmark were exchanged for the new currency at a rate of DM 1 = 10 ℛℳ for the essential currency such as wages, payment of rents etc., and DM 1 = 10 ℛℳ for the remainder in private non-bank credit balances, with half frozen. Large amounts were exchanged for 10 ℛℳ to 65pf. In addition, each person received a per capita allowance of DM 60 in two parts, the first being DM 40 and the second DM 20.

A few weeks later Erhard, acting against orders, issued an edict abolishing many economic controls which had been originally implemented by the Nazis, and which the Allies had not removed. He did this, as he often confessed, on Sunday because the offices of the American, British, and French occupation authorities were closed that day. He was sure that if he had done it when they were open, they would have countermanded the order.

The introduction of the new currency was intended to protect western Germany from a second wave of hyperinflation and to stop the rampant barter and black market trade (where cigarettes were used as currency). Although the new currency was initially only distributed in the three western occupation zones outside Berlin, the move angered the Soviet authorities, who regarded it as a threat. The Soviets promptly cut off all road, rail and canal links between the three western zones and West Berlin, starting the Berlin Blockade. In response, the U.S. and Britain launched an airlift of food and coal and distributed the new currency in West Berlin as well.

Economics of 1948 currency reform
Since the 1930s, prices and wages had been controlled, but money had been plentiful. That meant that people had accumulated large paper assets, and that official prices and wages did not reflect reality, as the black market dominated the economy and more than half of all transactions were taking place unofficially. The reform replaced the old money with the new Deutsche Mark at the rate of one new per ten old. This wiped out 90% of government and private debt, as well as private savings. Prices were decontrolled, and labor unions agreed to accept a 15% wage increase, despite the 25% rise in prices. The result was the prices of German export products held steady, while profits and earnings from exports soared and were poured back into the economy. The currency reforms were simultaneous with the $1.4 billion in Marshall Plan money coming in from the United States, which primarily was used for investment. In addition, the Marshall plan forced German companies, as well as those in all of Western Europe, to modernize their business practices, and take account of the wider market. Marshall plan funding overcame bottlenecks in the surging economy caused by remaining controls (which were removed in 1949), and opened up a greatly expanded market for German exports. Overnight, consumer goods appeared in the stores, because they could be sold for higher prices. While the availability of consumer goods is seen as a giant success story by most historians of the present, the perception at the time was a different one: prices were so high that average people could not afford to shop, especially since prices were free-ranging but wages still fixed by law. Therefore, in the summer of 1948 a giant wave of strikes and demonstrations swept over West Germany, leading to an incident in Stuttgart where strikers were met by US tanks ("Stuttgarter Vorfälle"). Only after the wage-freeze was abandoned, Deutschmark and free-ranging prices were accepted by the population.

Currency reform in the Soviet occupation zone
In the Soviet occupation zone of Germany (later the German Democratic Republic), the East German mark (also named "Deutsche Mark" from 1948 to 1964 and colloquially referred to as the Ostmark—literally Eastmark) was introduced a few days afterwards in the form of Reichsmark and Rentenmark notes with adhesive stamps to stop the flooding in of Reichsmark and Rentenmark notes from the West. In July 1948, a completely new series of East German mark banknotes was issued.

Bank deutscher Länder and the Deutsche Bundesbank
Later in 1948, the Bank deutscher Länder ("Bank of the German States") assumed responsibility, followed in 1957 by the Deutsche Bundesbank. The Deutsche Mark earned a reputation as a strong store of value at times when other national currencies succumbed to periods of inflation. It became a source of national pride and an anchor for the country's economic prosperity, particularly during the years of the Wirtschaftswunder in the 1950s.

Currency union with the Saarland
The population in the Saar Protectorate rejected in a referendum the proposal to turn it into a "European territory". Despite French pre-referendum claims that a "no" vote would mean that the Saar would remain a French protectorate it in fact resulted in the incorporation of the Saar into the Federal Republic of Germany on January 1, 1957. The new German member state of the Saarland maintained its currency, the Saar franc, which was in a currency union at par with the French franc. On July 9, 1959, the Deutsche Mark replaced the Saar franc at a ratio of 100 francs = DM 0.8507.

German reunification
The Deutsche Mark played an important role in the reunification of Germany. It was introduced as the official currency of East Germany in July 1990, replacing the East German mark (Mark der DDR), in preparation for unification on 3 October 1990. East German marks were exchanged for Deutsche Marks at a rate of 1:1 for the first M 4,000 and 2:1 for larger amounts. Before reunification, each citizen of East Germany coming to West Germany was given Begrüßungsgeld (welcome money), a per capita allowance of DM 100 in cash. The government of Germany and the Bundesbank were in major disagreement over the exchange rate between the East German mark and the German mark.

France and the United Kingdom were opposed to German reunification, and attempted to influence the Soviet Union to stop it. However, in late 1989 France extracted German commitment to the Monetary Union in return for support for German reunification.

Stability
The German mark had a reputation as one of the world's most stable currencies; this was based on the monetary policy of the Bundesbank. The policy was "hard" in relation to the policies of certain other central banks in Europe. The "hard" and "soft" was in respect to the aims of inflation and political interference. This policy was the foundation of the European Central Bank's present policy towards the euro. The German mark's stability was greatly apparent in 1993, when speculation on the French franc and other European currencies caused a change in the European Exchange Rate Mechanism. However, it should be remembered that "hard" is relative only if it is compared to other currencies, as in its 53-year history, the purchasing power of the German mark was reduced by over 70%.

Coins
The first Deutsche Mark coins were issued by the Bank deutscher Länder in 1948 and 1949. From 1950, the inscription Bundesrepublik Deutschland (Federal Republic of Germany) appeared on the coins. These coins were issued in denominations of 1pf, 2pf, 5pf, 10pf, and 50pf. The 1pf and 2pf coins were struck in bronze clad steel (although during some years the 2pf was issued in solid bronze) while 5pf and 10pf were brass clad steel and the 50-pfennig was in cupronickel. In 1950, cupronickel DM1 coins were released, while a cupronickel DM2 and a .625 silver DM5 were released in 1951. Cupronickel replaced silver in the DM5 in 1975. The DM2 and DM5 coins have often been used for commemorative themes, though typically only the generic design for the DM5 is intended for circulation. Commemorative silver DM10 coins have also been issued which have periodically found their way into circulation. Unlike other European countries, Germany retained the use of the smallest coins (1pf and 2pf) until adoption of the euro.

The weights and dimensions of the coins can be found in an FAQ of the Bundesbank.

Unlike other countries (such as Australia) there was no attempt or proposal suggested for the withdrawal of the 1pf and 2pf coins. Both coins were still in circulation in 2001 and supermarkets in particular still marked prices to the nearest pfennig. This penchant for accuracy continues with the euro (while Finland or the Netherlands for example, price to the nearest 5 cents) with the 1-cent coin still encountered in Germany.

There were a considerable number of commemorative silver DM 5 and DM 10 coins, which actually had the status of legal tender but were rarely seen outside of collectors' circles.

On 27 December 2000, the German government enacted a law authorizing the Bundesbank to issue, in 2001, a special .999 pure gold DM 1 coin commemorating the end of the German mark. The coin had the exact design and dimensions of the circulating cupro-nickel DM 1 coin, with the exception of the inscription on the reverse, which read "Deutsche Bundesbank" (instead of "Bundesrepublik Deutschland"), as the Bundesbank was the issuing authority in this case. A total of one million gold DM 1 coins were minted (200,000 at each of the five mints) and were sold beginning in mid-2001 through German coin dealers on behalf of the Bundesbank. The issue price varied by dealer but averaged approximately US$165.

German coins bear a mint mark, indicating where the coin was minted. D indicates Munich, F Stuttgart, G Karlsruhe and J Hamburg. Coins minted during the Second World War include the mint marks A (Berlin) and B (Vienna). The mint mark A was also used for German mark coins minted in Berlin beginning in 1990 following the reunification of Germany. These mint marks have been continued on the German euro coins.

Between July 1, 1990 (the currency union with East Germany) and July 1, 1991, East German coins in denominations up to 50 pfennigs continued to circulate as Deutsche Mark coins at their face value, owing to a temporary shortage of small coins. These coins were legal tender only in the territory of the former East Germany.

Colloquial expressions
In colloquial German the 10pf coin was sometimes called a groschen (cf. groat). Likewise, sechser (sixer) could refer to a coin of 5pf. Both colloquialisms refer to several pre-1871 currencies of the previously independent states (notably Prussia), where a groschen was subdivided into 12 pfennigs, hence half a groschen into 6. After 1871, 12 old pfennigs would be converted into 10pf of the mark, hence 10pf coins inherited the "Groschen" name and 5pf coins inherited the "sechser" name. Both usages are only regional and may not be understood in areas where a Groschen coin did not exist before 1871. In particular, the usage of "sechser" is less widespread. In northern Germany the DM 5 coin used to be also called a Heiermann, whereas in Bavaria the DM 2 coin was called "Zwickl" and this expression is now used for the €2 coin in the region.

Banknotes

There were four series of German mark banknotes:
 The first was issued in 1948 by the Allied military. There were denominations of DM, DM 1, DM 2, DM 5, DM 10, DM 20, DM 50 and DM 100, with two designs of DM 20 and DM 50.
 The second series (BdL) was introduced in 1948 by the Bank deutscher Länder, an institution of the western occupation government. The designs were similar to the US Dollar and French franc, as the job of designing and printing the different denominations was shared between the Bank of France and the American Bank Note Company. There were denominations of 5pf and 10pf, DM 5, DM 10, DM 20, DM 50 and DM 100 marks. The last of the banknotes (DM 5 and DM 10) were phased out by July 31, 1966.
 The third series (I/Ia BBk) was introduced in 1960 by the Bundesbank, depicting neutral symbols, paintings by the German painters, and buildings. There were denominations of DM 5, DM 10, DM 20, DM 50, DM 100, DM 500 and DM 1,000. The series ceased to be legal tender on June 30, 1995.
 The fourth (BBk III/III a) was introduced in 1990 by the Bundesbank to counter advances in forgery technology. The notes depicted German artists and scientists together with symbols and tools of their trade. This series added a DM200 denomination, to decrease the use of DM 100 banknotes, which made up 54% of all circulating banknotes, and to fill the gap between the DM 100 and DM 500 denominations. In 1997–1998, new versions of DM 50, DM 100 and DM 200 were issued with improved security elements.

The notes with a value greater than DM 200 were rarely seen.

A reserve series (BBk II) was commissioned on July 1, 1960, consisting of DM 10, DM 20, DM 50 and DM 100 banknotes. 670 million BBk II banknotes in value of 25 billion marks were printed. The notes were printed between 1963 and 1974 in fear if the Eastern Bloc would start systematically counterfeiting the BBk I series of banknotes to cripple the economy, then they would quickly be replaced by emergency notes. Another reserve series for West Berlin (BBk IIa) was commissioned on July 1, 1963, consisting of DM 5, DM 10, DM 20, DM 50 and DM 100 banknotes. 115 million West Berlin banknotes were printed, total value 4 billion marks. 15 billion marks worth of the banknotes were held in Bundesbank's custom-built underground bunker in Cochem in Rheinland-Pfalz, the rest was stored in Bundesbank's vault in Frankfurt.

Banknotes of the third series (BBk I/Ia)
In 1957, with Bank deutscher Länder and the states' central banks merging to form the Bundesbank, new banknotes were being designed, as "Bank deutscher Länder" on the previous series was no longer correct. The previous series' notes had been made out of less durable paper and had a rather short life. While previously damaged notes could be replaced from reserve stocks, this stock was also coming to an end, necessitating a reprint.

Typical security features at the time were guilloches, a multi-level head watermark and a security thread. Note numbers that fluoresced under UV light and green, yellow, and blue. 27 fluorescent fibers embedded in the paper appeared on most banknotes; however, some specimens without these features were in circulation. Starting in 1976, banknotes were equipped with machine-readable feature - a colorless inorganic oxide mixture applied to the security thread. Banknotes featuring that were designated BBk Ia within the Bundesbank. All banknotes of the third series bore the penalty for counterfeiting and forgery on the upper right corner of the reverse, from German penal code section 146: "Wer Banknoten nachmacht oder verfälscht, oder nachgemachte oder verfälschte sich verschafft und in Verkehr bringt, wird mit Zuchthaus/Freiheitsstrafe nicht unter zwei Jahren bestraft." ("Who falsifies or counterfeits banknotes, or procures falsified or counterfeit banknotes and releases them into circulation, is liable to imprisonment for at least two years".

The third series banknotes entered circulation on February 10, 1961, with the DM 20 note. DM 100 and DM 50 followed next year, and DM 5 and DM 10 in 1963. High-denomination DM 1000 and DM 500 followed in 1964 and 1965, respectively.

The banknotes were printed exclusively in West Germany - in Bundesdruckerei in West Berlin and in Giesecke+Devrient in Munich.

The third series banknotes ceased to be legal tender on June 30, 1995, when the fourth series notes had been in circulation for 3–5 years.

There were a total of five issues of the third series, main differences being the dates, and signatures of the Presidents and Vice Presidents of Bundesbank:

Banknotes of the fourth series
The design of German banknotes remained unchanged during the 1960s, 1970s and 1980s. During this period, forgery technology made significant advances and so, in the late 1980s, the Bundesbank decided to issue a new series of Deutsche Mark banknotes. The colours for each denomination remained unchanged from the previous series but the designs underwent significant changes and a DM 200 denomination was introduced. Famous national artists and scientists were chosen to be portrayed on the new banknotes. Male and female artists were chosen in equal numbers. The buildings in the background of the notes' obverses had a close relationship to the person displayed (e.g., place of birth, place of death, place of work), as well as the second background picture (Lyra and the musician Schumann). The reverses of the notes refer to the work of the person on the obverse.

The new security features were: a windowed security thread (with the notes' denominations in microprinting), watermarks, microprinting, intaglio printing (viewing-angle dependent visibility as well as a Braille representation of the notes denomination), colour-shifting ink (on the DM 500 and DM 1000 denominations), a see-through registration device and ultraviolet-visible security features.

First to be issued were the DM 100 and DM 200 denominations on 1 October 1990 (although the banknote shows "Frankfurt am Main, 2. Januar 1989"). The next denomination was DM 10 on 16 April 1991, followed by DM 50 on 30 September 1991. Next was the DM 20 note on 20 March 1992 (printed on 2 August 1991). The reason for this gradual introduction was, that public should become familiar with one single denomination, before introducing a new one. The change was finished with the introduction of the DM 5, DM 500, and DM 1000 denominations on 27 October 1992. The last two denominations were rarely seen in circulation and all were introduced in one step. With the advance of forgery technology, the Bundesbank decided to introduce additional security features on the most important denominations (DM 50, DM 100 and DM 200) as of 1996. These were a hologram foil in the center of the note's obverse, a matted printing on the note's right obverse, showing its denomination (like on the reverse of the new euro banknotes), and the EURion constellation on the note's reverse. Furthermore, the colours were changed slightly to hamper counterfeiting.

Spelling and pronunciation
The German name of the currency is Deutsche Mark; its plural form in standard German is the same as the singular. In German, the adjective "deutsche" (adjective for "German" in feminine singular nominative form) is capitalized because it is part of a proper name, while the noun "Mark", like all German nouns, is always capitalized. The English loanword "Deutschmark" has a slightly different spelling and one syllable fewer (possibly due to the frequency of silent e in English, or due to English's lack of adjectival endings), and a plural form in -s.

In Germany and other German speaking countries, the currency's name was often abbreviated as D-Mark or simply Mark with the latter term also often used in English. Like Deutsche Mark, D-Mark and Mark do not take the plural in German when used with numbers (like all names of units), the singular being used to refer to any amount of money (e.g. eine (one) Mark and dreißig (thirty) Mark). Sometimes, a very colloquial plural form of Mark, Märker  was used either as hypocoristic form or to refer to a small number of D-Mark coins or bills, e.g. Gib mir mal ein paar Märker ("Just give me a few marks") and Die lieben Märker wieder ("The lovely money again", with an ironic undertone).

The subdivision unit is spelled Pfennig, which unlike Mark does have a commonly used plural form: Pfennige, but the singular could also be used instead with no difference in meaning. (e.g.: ein (one) Pfennig, dreißig (thirty) Pfennige or dreißig (thirty) Pfennig). The official form is singular.

Reserve currency

Before the switch to the euro, the Deutsche Mark was the largest international reserve currency after the United States dollar.

See also
 Economy of Germany
 German euro coins
 German Papiermark and Notgeld
 German Reichsmark
 List of commemorative coins of the Federal Republic of Germany

Annotations

References

External links 

 Coins of the Third Reich
 Overview of German Mark from BBC online
 Historical US Dollars to German Marks currency conversion, 1913–2005
 Historical banknotes of Germany including East German banknotes

Currencies of Germany
Economy of West Germany
Modern obsolete currencies
Currencies replaced by the euro
Currencies of Europe
1948 establishments in Germany
2002 disestablishments in Germany
Currencies introduced in 1948
Currency symbols